The following radio stations broadcast on AM frequency 1380 kHz: 1380 AM is a Regional broadcast frequency, on which Class B and Class D stations broadcast.

Argentina
 LRI231 in Necochea, Buenos Aires

Canada
 CKPC in Brantford, Ontario - 25 kW, transmitter located at

Chile
 W radio 138 in Santiago

Mexico
 XECO-AM in Mexico City

United States

References

Lists of radio stations by frequency